Sugar & Spite is the debut album from Unkle Bob, a Glasgow five piece who have been creating music together for around two years, forming whilst at college together. Produced by Saul Davies, guitarist and co-producer with British rock group James. The album was released in the UK on 16 October 2006.

Track listing
 "Birds and the Bees" – 3:21
 "The Hit Parade" – 3:25
 "One By One" – 2:40
 "Better Off" – 3:48
 "Put A Record On" – 3:43
 "Hold It Down" – 3:16
 "This Way" – 3:12
 "Vagabond" – 3:49
 "Too Many People" – 3:25
 "Swans" – 2:30
 "What Do I Know" – 4:12

References

2006 debut albums
Unkle Bob albums